Kevin Williams may refer to:

Kevin Williams (music producer) (born 1956), Canadian music producer and audio engineer
Kevin Williams (basketball) (born 1961), retired American basketball player
Kevin Williams (cornerback) (born 1961), former American football cornerback 
Kevin Williams (running back) (1970–2012), American football running back
Kevin Williams (wide receiver, born 1958), American football wide receiver
Kevin Williams (wide receiver, born 1971), former American football wide receiver 
Kevin Williams (defensive back) (born 1975), former American football defensive back
Kevin Williams (defensive tackle) (born 1980), American football defensive tackle
K-Warren (born 1974), alias of UK garage producer Kevin Williams

See also 
Kevon Williams (born 1991), American rugby player